Terry Sullivan may refer to:

Terry Sullivan (athlete) (born 1935), Zimbabwean Olympic athlete
Terry Sullivan (Australian politician) (born 1949), former Australian politician
Teresa A. Sullivan (born 1949), president of the University of Virginia
Terry Sullivan, drummer in the British band Renaissance
Terry Sullivan (bowls) (born 1935), Welsh bowler
Terry Sullivan (political consultant), American political consultant
Terry Sullivan (Brookside), fictional character in the British soap opera Brookside

See also
Terence M. O'Sullivan (born 1955), American labor leader
Terence O'Sullivan (politician) (1924–1997), Irish politician 
Terence Patrick O'Sullivan (1913–1970), British civil engineer
Terry O'Sullivan (1915–2006), American actor